Pieces is the international debut studio album by Swedish singer-songwriter Erik Hassle, released on 18 January 2010 in Scandinavia and in the United Kingdom on 22 February 2010. The album features tracks from his Swedish debut album Hassle (2009), with the tracks "Don't Bring Flowers", "The Thanks I Get, "Bitter End", and "Wanna Be Loved" being remixed for the international market, and the new song "Amelia". The album's second single "Hurtful" was released in the UK on 8 February, and peaked at number 59 on the UK Singles Chart. The album, however, failed to chart within the top 40.

Track listing

Release history

References

2009 albums
Erik Hassle albums